
Big Spring is one of the largest springs in the United States and the world. An enormous first magnitude spring, it rises at the base of a bluff on the west side of the Current River valley in the Missouri Ozarks.

Location 
Located about four miles downstream from Van Buren, it is within the boundaries of the Ozark National Scenic Riverways, and its visitor facilities are managed by the National Park Service. It is a contributing resource to Big Spring Historic District, listed on the National Register of Historic Places in 1981.

Description 
The spring is by far the largest spring in the Ozark Plateau region. The only two springs in the Ozark region that approach the size of Big Spring are Greer Spring and Mammoth Spring. Maximum discharge of Big Spring must be estimated because backwater from the Current River makes accurate high water measurements impossible.

The spring outlet 
The spring issues from the base of a limestone bluff, churning out aqua-blue water with great force, creating white caps, then quickly calming to a crystal clear channel. The spring water travels about  where it adds itself to the Current River. The water is about 58 degrees Fahrenheit (13.3 °C), and the spring is surrounded by a well maintained park and a steep valley hillside covered in hardwood forest. Most of the known drainage basin encompasses northern areas of the Eleven Point River watershed. Big Spring is ever increasing in size, as the groundwater continues to dissolve limestone in a vast karst system, and continuation of stream capture in greater quantities. The spring is estimated to dissolve and remove 175 tons of limestone during an average day.

See also
List of Ozark springs
Karst spring

References

Further reading

External links 
 Ozark National Scenic Riverways

Protected areas of the U.S. Interior Highlands
Bodies of water of Carter County, Missouri
Springs of Missouri